Justin Trevor Milne, (born 19 November 1952) is an Australian business executive and company director known for his roles as Chairman of the Australian Broadcasting Corporation, chief of broadband services at Telstra, and CEO at OzEmail, as well as serving on the boards of Tabcorp, the National Basketball League, NetComm Wireless, ME Bank and MYOB Group. and NBN Co

Milne was born in Adelaide, South Australia and was educated at St Peter's College before gaining a Bachelor of Arts from Flinders University. After university, he worked in the film industry, joining the South Australian Film Corporation where he produced several short documentary films and worked as an assistant editor on films including Peter Weir's The Last Wave. In the 1980s, Milne bought a film company in Sydney and moved there, where he became involved in the technology sector, and co-founding a car sales listing platform, Globe Media. He then moved on as a director at MSN, then later OzEmail, and then to Telstra. Milne was appointed as Chairman of the ABC in 2017.

After the sacking of ABC Managing Director Michelle Guthrie in September 2018, it was alleged that Milne had asked for journalist Emma Alberici to be sacked, leading to protests from ABC staff and calls for an inquiry.  Further allegations have surfaced about Milne asking for Andrew Probyn's sacking in relation to Probyn's reporting of the Super Saturday by-elections.  Milne has also resigned and has denied sending emails regarding Alberici or Probyn.

Milne simultaneously held positions with ABC, NBN Co and NetComm Wireless (a supplier to NBN Co) leading to comment of conflict of interest and workload.

References 

Living people
Flinders University alumni
Fellows of the Australian Institute of Company Directors
20th-century Australian businesspeople
21st-century Australian businesspeople
1952 births